Zieria baeuerlenii, commonly known as the Bomaderry zieria, is a plant in the citrus family Rutaceae and is endemic to a small area on the south coast of New South Wales.  It is a sometimes straggly shrub with velvety leaves composed of three leaflets. In late autumn to spring there are clusters of small white to pinkish flowers with four petals and which appear to be unable to produce seeds.

Description
The other two leaflets are similar in shape but slightly smaller. Each leaflet has a velvety covering of hairs and has its edges rolled under.

Four large green, leaf-like bracts surround each flower cluster. Flowering occurs from September to October but fruit have never been observed and evidence suggests that the species has lost its ability to reproduce sexually.

Taxonomy and naming
Bomaderry zieria was first formally described in 2002 by James Andrew Anderson from a specimen collected near Bomaderry Creek. The description was published in Australian Systematic Botany. The specific epithet (baeuerlenii) honours the German-born plant collector Wilhelm Baeuerlen who moved to Australia in about 1883, lived in the Shoalhaven area and collected for Ferdinand von Mueller and Joseph Maiden.

Distribution and habitat
Zieria baeuerlenii is only known from an area of  near Bomaderry. In grows in soil derived from sandstone in forest, woodland and scrub.

Ecology
Fruit or seed of Bomaderry Zieria has not been observed and it is thought that the species has lost the ability to reproduce sexually and probably reproduces from suckers. It has the ability to regenerate after bushfire.

Conservation
Bomaderry zieria is listed as "Endangered" under the New South Wales Threatened Species Conservation Act and under the Commonwealth Government Environment Protection and Biodiversity Conservation Act 1999 (EPBC) Act. Some of the threats to the species are habitat damage due to illegal activities, weed invasion, grazing by rabbits and frequent fires.

References

External links
 

baeuerlenii
Sapindales of Australia
Flora of New South Wales
Plants described in 2002